Hairspray Live! is an American television special that aired live on the American television network NBC on December 7, 2016. Produced by Craig Zadan and Neil Meron, and hosted by Darren Criss, it is a performance of a new adaptation of the 2002 Broadway musical Hairspray.

Premise
Hairspray Live! takes place in 1962 Baltimore. Teenager Tracy Turnblad's dream is to dance on The Corny Collins Show, a local TV program. When, against all odds, Tracy wins a role on the show, she becomes a celebrity overnight and meets a colorful array of characters, including Link, the resident dreamboat; Amber, the ambitious mean girl; Seaweed, an African-American boy she meets in detention; and his mother, Motormouth Maybelle, owner of a local record store. Tracy's mother is the indomitable Edna Turnblad, and she eventually encourages Tracy on her campaign to integrate the all-White Corny Collins Show.

Cast and characters
Main cast

 Maddie Baillio as Tracy Turnblad
 Harvey Fierstein as Edna Turnblad
 Martin Short as Wilbur Turnblad
 Jennifer Hudson as Maybelle "Motormouth" Stubbs
 Garrett Clayton as Link Larkin
 Ariana Grande as Penny Pingleton
 Kristin Chenoweth as Velma Von Tussle
 Derek Hough as Corny Collins
 Dove Cameron as Amber Von Tussle
 Ephraim Sykes as Seaweed J. Stubbs
 Shahadi Wright Joseph as Inez Stubbs

Minor roles

 Andrea Martin as Prudy Pingleton
 Paul Vogt as Mr. Harriman F. Spritzer
 Billy Eichner as Rob Barker
 Sean Hayes as Mr. Pinky
 Rosie O'Donnell as The Gym Teacher

Council members

 Riley Costello as Brad
 Marissa Heart as Tammy
 Mason Trueblood as Fender
 Jacque Lewarne as Brenda
 Ricky Schroeder as Sketch
 Helene Britany as Shelley
 Sam Faulkner as I.Q.
 Kelli Erdmann as Lou Ann
 Katherine Roarty as Kooks
 Heather Tepe as Belle
 Tommy Martinez as Corey
 Karl Skyler Urban as Jon

The Dynamites

 Kamilah Marshall
 Judine Somerville
 Shayna Steele

Motormouth Kids

 Joshua Alexander as James
 Will B. Bell as Duane
 Joanna Jones as Genie Mae
 Tiana Okoye as Lorraine
 Amos Oliver III as Thad
 Re'sean Pates as Jackie
 Rhon Saunders as Gilbert

Various ensemble
 Zack Everhart, Annie Gratton, Thomasina Gross, Allie Meixner, Eliotte Nicole, Tyler Parks, Andrew Pirozzi, Joy Marie Thomas, Keenan Washington, and Jason Williams

Cameos
 Ricki Lake (Tracy Turnblad in the original 1988 film) and Marissa Jaret Winokur (original Tracy Turnblad on Broadway) as Mr. Pinky's Girls

Personnel
Musicians
Pete Anthony – conductor, keyboards
Wade Culbreath – percussion
Greg Howe – lead guitar
George Doering – rhythm guitar
Don Payne – electric bass
Chad Wackerman – drums 
Jim Cox – piano, keyboards  
Jenny Scheming, Moses Holland – violins
Keith Norman – viola
Richard Schenker – cello
Jerry Hey, Gary Grant – trumpets
Bill Reichenbach Jr. – trombone
Kim Hutchcroft, Larry Williams – saxophones, flutes
Allie Feder, Baraka May, Jackie Seiden, Dorian Holley, Fred White, Arnold McCuller – backing vocals
Dorian Holley – vocal coach

Dancers
Thomasina Gross
Andrew Pirozzi
Allie Meixner
Tyler Parks
Keenan D. Washington
Zack Everhart Jr.
Annie Gratton
Unissa Cruse Ferguson
Joy Marie Thomas
Drew Hoffman
Eliotte Nicole

Musical numbers
The musical numbers from the track list of the soundtrack.

Production

Development
Hairspray Live! served as NBC's fourth entry in its series of made-for-TV musical telecasts, behind The Wiz Live!,  Peter Pan Live!, and The Sound of Music Live!. As with its predecessors, it was executive produced by Craig Zadan and Neil Meron. The project was revealed by NBC's entertainment head Bob Greenblatt during a Television Critics Association press tour in January 2016. In response to early reports that NBC was considering a live version of The Music Man, West Side Story, or Rodgers and Hammerstein's Cinderella, Greenblatt stated that "people have been saying to me since The Wiz, 'Do this show, do that show.' I've heard obscure titles and famous titles. Not everything's going to be a big name to the whole audience. I don't think there's an infinite number of these that can be done. But we're still doing it." He explained that the production would not try to emulate the 2007 film (also produced by Zadan and Meron), but that he would have been thrilled if John Travolta reprised his role in it.

Kenny Leon returned in his role as director from The Wiz, and was joined by Alex Rudzinski—who co-directed Grease: Live for Fox. The musical was adapted for television by Harvey Fierstein from the original book by Mark O'Donnell and Thomas Meehan. Jerry Mitchell, the choreographer of the Broadway version of Hairspray, was also involved with the adaptation. In contrast to NBC's previous musicals, Hairspray Live! was produced from the Universal Studios backlot; Greenblatt explained that a "fair amount" of the show would be staged in outdoor settings, and thus "have a real exuberance in the open air." Additionally, live audiences were integrated into relevant scenes as extras on-stage, such as bystanders in Baltimore, and as the studio audience of The Corny Collins Show. Two numbers written for the 2007 film, "Ladies' Choice" and "Come So Far (Got So Far to Go)", were incorporated into the production. "The Big Dollhouse", from the Broadway show, was cut, while "The New Girl In Town", written for the stage show but cut and only used in the film, was not added. (An instrumental version of the song is, however, heard very briefly as a bit of background music.)

Casting
In addition to adapting the book, Fierstein reprised the role of Edna Turnblad from the Broadway musical; Greenblatt felt that his performance of Edna was "iconic", and that his involvement with Hairspray Live! made it "come full circle". NBC cast the lead role of Tracy Turnblad through an open call in New York City, hoping to repeat the "phenomenal discovery" of Shanice Williams for The Wiz Live!. The role went to college sophomore Maddie Baillio, as her first professional role. In November 2016, it was announced that Ricki Lake and Marissa Jaret Winokur (who portrayed Tracy Turnblad in the 1988 film and the Broadway version respectively) would make cameo appearances; Winokur and Lake appeared as employees of Mr. Pinky's boutique. Darren Criss served as an on-air host, hosting a half-hour Countdown to Hairspray Live! show on NBC with Kristin Chenoweth and Sean Hayes, as well as behind-the-scenes reports throughout the live broadcast.

Marketing
Oreo, Reddi-wip, and Toyota broadcast live, themed commercials during Hairspray Live!; Oreo's ad featured the character of Corny Collins, Reddi-wip's ad featured a milkman character (Evan Strand) backstage and performing a dance number, while Toyota's ad featured a vintage Toyota Corolla and a current model in celebration of the vehicle's 50th anniversary.

Reception

Critical response
On Rotten Tomatoes, the special holds a 76% rating based on 25 reviews, with an average of 8.2/10. The site's consensus states: "Hairspray Live! shimmers with outstanding performances, an engaging story, and songs that let its stars shine." It has a score of 66 from 14 critics on Metacritic, indicating "generally favorable reviews".

Neil Genzlinger of The New York Times wrote: "NBC lassoed some talented performers with fine singing voices but sacrificed cohesion by cramming the evening with too much interstitial fluff.... Only Jennifer Hudson, who played Motormouth Maybelle, found the real strength of this Tony-winning musical, delivering a knockout rendition of 'I Know Where I've Been'..." He noted that Baillio "did pretty well, though no novice is going to compete with voices like those of Ms. Hudson and Kristin Chenoweth..."

Sonia Saraiya of Variety wrote that it "took a few musical numbers to settle into a rhythm. But once it did (the energy seemed to kick in with "Welcome to the '60s") the musical easily became the best NBC has attempted. It's hard to imagine better casting for the production. Jennifer Hudson stole the show... Ariana Grande, certifiable pop star, came away as the show's MVP, acting as both reliably overlook-able sidekick and, once the situation required it, showstopping diva. Harvey Fierstein was predictably great... Martin Short... found the right profile for himself as Wilbur."

Rebecca Bunch of The TV Ratings Guide called the production "a great experience through and through." She called he cast "top notch", and praised Grande and Hudson in particular. She also named "You Can't Stop the Beat" the best musical moment of the night and stated that "they really knocked it out of the park", stating that "NBC really put together something amazing here."

Caroline Siede of The A.V. Club wrote that "As a piece of social commentary, tonight's production of Hairspray Live! was just about flawless." She stated that Dove Cameron and Ephraim Sykes were "consistently fun to watch", Chenoweth and Hudson "were the biggest scene-stealers.", and Fierstein, Short, and Martin "were all wonderful as well." She rated the telecast a B+.

In his 2019 essay collection Mr. Know-It-All, John Waters called the special "OK—but the weakest" of Hairsprays various iterations, expressing reservations about some of the casting decisions, as well as lamenting that neither he nor any surviving cast members of The Buddy Deane Show, the real-life basis of The Corny Collins Show, were consulted for the production.

Viewership
Hairspray Live! was seen by 9.05 million viewers, with a ratings share of 2.3 in the 18–49 demographic, and a 5.9 overnight household rating. It was the most-viewed program of the night, with numbers on par with those of Peter Pan. An encore presentation, which aired on December 27, was seen by 2.5 million viewers.

Awards and nominations

See also

 2016 in American television
 Civil rights movement in popular culture
 The Sound of Music Live! (2013), NBC
 Peter Pan Live! (2014), NBC
 The Wiz Live! (2015), NBC
 Grease: Live (2016), Fox
 A Christmas Story Live! (2017), Fox
 Jesus Christ Superstar Live in Concert (2018), NBC
 Rent: Live (2019), Fox

References

External links
 
 

2016 television specials
2010s American television specials
American dance films
American live television shows
American teen comedy films
American teen musical films
American teen romance films
English-language television shows
Films about television
Films based on musicals based on films
Films set in 1962
Films set in Baltimore
Films scored by Marc Shaiman
John Waters
Musical television films
Musical television specials
NBC television specials
Television shows set in Baltimore
Films directed by Kenny Leon